Marshall Hall may refer to:

People 
Marshall Hall (physiologist) (1790–1857), English physiologist
George Marshall-Hall (1862–1915), Australian musician and educator, his grandson
Marshall Hall (mathematician) (1910–1990), American mathematician
Edward Marshall Hall (1858–1927), English barrister and MP
Marshall Hall (singer) (born 1970), former member of the Gaither Vocal Band

Places 
Marshall Hall, Maryland, listed on the NRHP in Maryland
Marshall Hall (Amherst, Massachusetts), a former microbiology laboratory at the University of Massachusetts
Marshall Hall (amusement park), an amusement park at Marshall Hall, Maryland

See also
Marsh Hall (disambiguation)

Hall, Marshall
Architectural disambiguation pages